Crime Patrol is an Indian crime anthology series created by Subramanian S.lyer for Sony Entertainment Television India and Sony Entertainment Television Asia. The first season was created by Cinevistaas Limited and directed by Anshuman Kishore Singh, while later seasons were created by Optimystix Entertainment. The series is set in Mumbai, India. The first and second seasons' episodes are 30 minutes long, while the subsequent seasons' episodes are 40 minutes long.

The series, which premiered on May 9, 2003, is the longest-running reality crime television series in India. The series is in its fifth season which premiered on July 15, 2019. In 2021, the show won the Milestone Achievement Award at the 20th Indian Television Academy Awards (ITA Awards).

Plot
The series presents dramatized versions of crime cases that occurred in India. Series anchor, Anup Soni, suggests the correct measures to avert crimes while narrating real-life stories revolving around harassment, kidnapping, and murder. The series opens its viewers’ minds with these cases by making them aware of the crime around them.

Since June 2015, Crime Patrol has not only focused on creating awareness about crimes but has also aimed to help the victims depicted in the episodes.

Cast

Hosts 
 Diwakar Pundir
 Shakti Anand
 Sakshi Tanwar
 Anup Soni
 Sanjeev Tyagi
   Nissar Khan                 
 Sonali Kulkarni
 Divyanka Tripathi
 Ashutosh Rana        
 Renuka Shahane

Recurring 
 Nissar Khan as Adil Khan
 Sanjeev Tyagi as Abhimanyu Jindal
 Ankit Bhardwaj
Pushkar Priyadarshi  
 Ashish Dixit as Rohan Mathur (A Dead Body in Water Tank) & as Ajit (A String of Violent Crime)
Rohit Tailor
 Sana Sayyad as Manisha
 Adaa Khan
 Ujjwal Chopra
 Lankesh Bhardwaj
Shilpa Gandhi Mohile
 Pankaj Berry
 Kamlesh Oza
 Rushad Rana
 Harsh Khurana
 Reema Worah
 Ashi Singh
 Mazher Sayed
Vikas Verma
 Sudeep Sarangi
 Nabeel Ahmed Mirajkar 
 Avneet Kaur as Kajal
 Vishal Jethwa as Vicky
 Sayantani Ghosh                 
 Shriya Pilgaonkar              
 Ahsaas Channa
 Akshita Mudgal
 Aadesh Chaudhary as Rupank Bhanot
Mahendra Tripathi
Sourav Jain
Moin Azam Khan
Shashwita Sharma
Suman Singh
Manish Raj Sharma
Anuj Nayak
Madan Tyagi
Neeraj Singh
 Ashish Kulkarni 
 Taiyaba Mansuri
 Tahura Mansuri
 Simar khera as kundan
 Sonam arora
 Zainab Shaikh

Special appearances
Juhi Chawla (2011)
Kailash Satyarthi (2015)
Ranveer Singh (2015)

Series overview

Season 1 (2003–2006)
The first season was a weekly program airing on Friday nights, hosted by Diwakar Pundir, who later was replaced by Shakti Anand in late 2004. Nitesh Mishra was the casting director. Season one was immediately popular.

Season 2 (2010)
Due to the popularity of the first season, Sony TV decided to bring back the series for a second season. The second season was aired from Monday to Thursday nights. Season 2 was presented by Anup Soni and Sakshi Tanwar. Unlike first season these season didn't perform well in TRP Ratings.

Season 3 (2010)
The third season was broadcast on Friday and Saturday nights. These season soon went off-air due to low TRP ratings.

Season 4 (2011–2018)
The fourth season premiered four months after the third season ended as Crime Patrol Dastak. The season managed to gain better TRP ratings. The fourth season was initially aired on Friday and Saturday nights. From April 11, 2014, the series was aired three days a week from Friday to Sunday nights. The series was given a new title Crime Patrol Satark (previously Crime Patrol Dastak until July 6, 2014). During the last quarter of 2017, Soni decided to exit the series citing that he wanted to focus on his acting career in films. "I requested makers that I would like to focus on films and they were ok with it. They wanted me to complete my contract that ended this March–April", said Soni. After Anup Soni, Sanjeev Tyagi replaced him until he joined again.

Season 5 (2019–2021)
The fifth season premiered on July 15, 2019, and airs on Monday–Friday nights. Anup Soni returned to host the series 15 months after leaving the show. After some time, Divyanka Tripathi Dahiya hosted the show, then Sonali Kulkarni followed by Ashutosh Rana became presenter of the show. In December it was announced that the show would be halting for three months but may return afterwards.

Season 6 (2022)
The sixth season titled Crime Patrol 2.0 premiered on March 7, 2022, and airs on Monday–Friday nights. This season got low TRP ratings due to its format, so later the show returned to its original old format with old actors like Sanjeev Tyagi, Nissar Khan etc. Sanjeev Tyagi returned to the show in May 2022.

Spin-off
A spin-off series Crime Patrol Dial 100 premiered on October 26, 2015, aired on Monday–Thursday nights, and was produced by different production companies. It ended on July 12, 2019.

Delhi gang-rape case

Bhartiya Stree Shakti (Nagpur Wing), a non-governmental organisation, Information and Broadcasting Ministry of India intervened and asked Sony Entertainment Television not to telecast a program about the Delhi gang-rape case.  But on 10 September 2013, the show was given permission  to present the 2012 Delhi gang rape case on their show, and subsequently the promos of the episode were also aired. The episode was aired in a two-episode part on September 21, 2013, and September 22, 2013. And in this episode head police inspector's role was played by Sanjeev Tyagi.

Om Prakash Chautala teacher recruitment scam
Sony TV was to air episodes based on Om Prakash Chautala teacher recruitment scam in the show. On 22 February 2013 Delhi High Court restrained Sony TV from telecasting the related episodes until 4 April 2013, upon the appeal by Chautala and others as the case was still in court and there was a possibility of bias of the show on the case. On 2 March 2013, show was given clearance by High Court. However, clearance was challenged in Supreme Court and on 6 March 2013, the episodes of this case were again put on hold. On 3 May 2013, the Supreme Court allowed Sony TV to telecast episodes as the trial was complete and judgment of conviction and sentence are in public domain.

Reception

Critical response
Crime Patrol generally receives positive reviews from critics. Riptide Malhotra of India TV stated, "The popularity of Crime Patrol is quite high that airs on Sony on weekends. The show is so popular that it keeps people awake until late at night to watch the latest episodes. This show is not just a show that airs crime stories but is a true depiction of real-life happenings presented in a dramatized form."

Ratings

Riptide Malhotra of India TV gave the series 4/5 stars and further stated, "The show is presented in such a way that will not threaten you but will make you conscious enough with that extra punch and appeal. Overall, to make the show convincing is the major responsibility of the host."

In 2011, it was one of the most watched Hindi GEC maintaining its position in top 20 averaging 3+ TVR. The Baby Falak Case sequence aired during February 2012 made the series the most watched Hindi GEG program with 6.78 TVR. The following week after it, the series maintained its top position with 5.27 TVR. gmil

Accolades
The series has won Star Guild Awards for Best Non-Fiction Series in 2013. The series has also won Indian Telly Awards for Best Thriller Programme in 2012 and 2013. Subramanian S Iyer and Amit Jha (directors) won Indian Telly Jury Award for Best Director (thriller/crime/horror) in 2012, while Durgesh Pesharwar and Shailendra were nominated. Shreya Dudheria and Subramanian S Iyer were also nominated for the same category of the same award in 2013. Subramanian S Iyer was nominated for Best Screenplay Writer (drama series & soap) of Indian Telly Jury Awards in 2012, while won in 2013. Charudutt Acharya won Indian Telly Jury Award for Best Dialogue Writer (drama series & soap) in 2013. The series was nominated for Best Weekly Serial of Indian Telly Awards in 2012 and 2013 and for Best Thriller / Horror Serial of Indian Television Academy Awards in 2014. In February 2021, the series won the Milestone Achievement Award at the 20th Indian Television Academy Awards (ITA Awards).

References

External links

Watch Crime Patrol Satark – Official Website

2003 Indian television series debuts
2010s Indian television series
Fictional portrayals of police departments in India
Hindi-language television shows
Indian crime television series
Indian reality television series
Sony Entertainment Television original programming
Television series by Optimystix Entertainment
Television shows set in Mumbai